Antalya Kemerspor, formerly Kemer Tekirovaspor, Kemerspor 2003, is a football club located in Antalya, Turkey. Kemerspor 2003 promoted to the TFF Third League after the 2008–09 season.

Previous names
 Tekirova Belediyespor (2003–2014)
 Kemer Tekirovaspor (2014–2015)
 Kemerspor 2003 (2015–2018)
 Antalya Kemerspor (2018–present)

League participations
TFF Third League: 2009–present

Stadium
Currently the team plays at the 2,000-capacity Dr. Fehmi Öncel Stadium.

Current squad

References

External links 
Kemerspor 2003 on TFF.org

TFF Third League clubs
Football clubs in Turkey